Dennis Mack Pearson (born February 9, 1955) is a former American football wide receiver. He played for the Atlanta Falcons from 1978 to 1979.

References

1955 births
Living people
American football wide receivers
Washington State Cougars football players
San Diego State Aztecs football players
Atlanta Falcons players